Othel Doyle Kelley (born July 23, 1987) is an American politician and lawyer. He served as the Republican Majority Whip of the Georgia House of Representatives until July 2021 from House District 16, covering much of Bartow, Haralson, and Polk Counties.

Kelley was first elected to the Georgia House of Representatives in 2012 after beating a Democratic incumbent.

Indictment
Kelley was indicted December 9, 2020, following an investigation into a vehicular  homicide resulting from a hit and run crash in Cedartown, Georgia. The driver of the vehicle involved, Ralph “Ryan” Dover III, left the scene of the accident, calling Kelley from a mile away. Kelley, who saw the vehicle, contacted the Cedartown police chief at his home phone number as opposed to calling 911, constituting a "gross deviation from the standard of care which a reasonable person would exercise in the situation," the indictment said. The man hit by Dover died in a ditch during the hour period before emergency services were summoned. A judge dismissed a misdemeanor charge and indictment against Kelley in December 2021.

Committee assignments
Representative Kelly currently serves on the following committees:

Appropriations (Ex-Officio)
Code Revision (Member)
Energy, Utilities, and Telecommunications (Member)
Health and Human Services (Member)
Higher Education (Secretary)
Judiciary (Secretary)
Ways and Means (Vice Chairman)

References 

Republican Party members of the Georgia House of Representatives
Living people
21st-century American politicians
1987 births